"I'm a Freak" is a 2014 song by Enrique Iglesias featuring Pitbull

Music
 I'm a Freak, album by DJ Pierre 2003

Songs
 "I'm a Freak", song by DJ Pierre 2003
 "I'm a Freak", song by Yelawolf 2010
 "I'm a Freak", song by Fukkk Offf from Love Me Hate Me Kiss Me Kill Me 2009

See also 

 Creep, Radiohead song with the line "I'm a creep"